According to the United States Internal Revenue Code certain losses are deductible for tax purposes. To qualify, the loss must not be compensated by insurance and it must be sustained during the taxable year. If the loss is a casualty or theft of the personal, family, or living property of the taxpayer, the loss must result from an event that is identifiable, damaging, and sudden, unexpected, and unusual in nature. Examples are hurricanes, tornadoes, and floods. A house that suffers from termite damage would not generally qualify because it is considered to be gradual and progressive. The loss is reduced by a $100 per event and the total loss might be reduced by the 10% of adjusted gross income floor.

Case law
 
  
 Smith v. Commissioner (1939)

References

External links
 https://www.irs.gov/taxtopics/tc515.html

Taxation in the United States